Jinja Regional Referral Hospital, commonly known as Jinja Hospital, is a hospital in the city of Jinja, in the Eastern Region of Uganda. It is the largest hospital in eastern Uganda, with a bed capacity of 600, although many more patients are admitted, with many sleeping on the floor.

Location
The hospital is located in the center of Jinja, not far from the Source of the Nile. It is the Regional Referral Hospital for the districts of Bugiri, Iganga, Jinja, Kaliro, Kamuli, Luuka, Mayuge, Namayingo, Kayunga and parts of Buikwe. The coordinates of Jinja Regional Referral Hospital are:
00°25'52.0"N, 33°12'18.0"E (Latitude:0.431111; Longitude:33.205000).

Overview
Jinja Hospital is one of the thirteen (13) Regional Referral Hospitals in Uganda. It is also one of the fifteen (15) hospitals designated as Internship Hospitals, where graduates of Ugandan medical schools may undergo a year of internship under the supervision of consultants and specialists in the designated medical and surgical disciplines. The hospital is currently undergoing major renovations as a result of available funds from the government for capital development.

Intensive Care Unit
In July 2009, a new 20-bed intensive care unit (ICU) was commissioned. Construction funds were donated by: 1. The Rotary Club of Jinja in District 9200 2. The Rotary Club of Eugene, Oregon, United States in District 5110 3. The Government of Uganda through the Ministry of Finance Planning and Economic Development.

The life-sustaining equipment in the ICU were donated by:
1. Assist International, a California, United States based NGO and 2. General Electric, an American conglomerate that manufactures high-tech medical equipment among other precision instruments.

See also
Hospitals in Uganda

References

External links
 ICU Under Construction at Jinja Hospital
 Jinja Hospital's Resources are Stretched
 DFCU Bank Donates Incubators to Jinja Hospital

Hospitals in Uganda
Jinja, Uganda
Busoga
Eastern Region, Uganda